Seleninyl fluoride is an oxyfluoride of selenium with the chemical formula SeOF2.

Preparation
Seleninyl fluoride can be produced by the reaction of selenium oxychloride and potassium fluoride.
2 KF + SeOCl2 → 2 KCl + SeOF2

It can also be produced by the reaction of selenium tetrafluoride with water or selenium dioxide.
SeF4 + H2O → SeOF2 + 2 HF
SeF4 + SeO2 → 2 SeOF2

The reaction of selenium dioxide and sulfur tetrafluoride also produces seleninyl fluoride.
SeO2 + SF4 → SeOF2 + SOF2

Reactions
Seleninyl fluoride reacts with xenon difluoride to form Xe(OSeF5)2.
3 XeF2 + 2 SeOF2 → Xe(OSeF5)2 + 2 Xe

It reacts with fluorine gas and potassium fluoride to form pentafluoroselenium hypofluorite.
SeOF2 + KF → K+[SeOF3]- —F2→ K+[SeOF5]- —F2→ KF + SeOF6

Uses
Seleninyl fluoride have been used as specialty solvents.

References

Selenium(IV) compounds
Oxyfluorides